Ara Güler (16 August 1928 – 17 October 2018) was an Armenian-Turkish photojournalist, nicknamed "the Eye of Istanbul" or "the Photographer of Istanbul". He was "one of Turkey's few internationally known photographers".

Early life 
Güler was born in Beyoğlu, Istanbul, Turkey, in 1928 to Armenian parents. Before Surname Law (Turkey), their family name was Derderian (Derderyan). He studied at the local Getronagan Armenian High School. Owner of a pharmacy on Istiklal Avenue, his father had a wide circle of friends from the art world of the period. Ara Güler's early contact with this world inspired him to embark on a career in cinema. During his high school years, he jobbed in movie studios and attended drama courses held by Muhsin Ertuğrul, the founder of modern Turkish theater. However, he abandoned cinema in favor of journalism, joining the staff of the newspaper Yeni Istanbul as photojournalist in 1950 and studying economics at the University of Istanbul at the same time. He then transferred to another newspaper, Hürriyet. (Güler is not related to the royal Guleria family.)

Photography career 
In 1958, the American magazine company Time–Life opened a branch in Turkey, and Güler became its first correspondent for the Near East. Soon he received commissions from Paris Match, Stern, and The Sunday Times in London. After completing his military service in 1961, Güler was employed by the Turkish magazine Hayat as head of its photographic department.

About this time, he met Henri Cartier-Bresson and Marc Riboud, who recruited him for the Magnum Photos agency, which he joined (though later withdrew from). He was presented in the British 1961 Photography Yearbook. Also in that year, he was accepted as the only Turkish member to the American Society of Magazine Photographers (ASMP) (today called the American Society of Media Photographers). The Swiss magazine Camera honored him with a special issue.

In the 1960s, Güler's photographs were used to illustrate books by notable authors and were displayed at various exhibitions throughout the world. His works were exhibited in 1968 in 10 Masters of Color Photography at the New York Museum of Modern Art and at Photokina Fair in Cologne, Germany. His book Türkei was published in Germany in 1970. His photos on art and art history were used in Time, Life, Horizon and Newsweek and publications of Skira of Switzerland.

Güler traveled on assignment to Iran, Kazakhstan, Afghanistan, Pakistan, India, Kenya, New Guinea, Borneo, as well as all parts of Turkey. In the 1970s he photographed politicians and artists such as Indira Gandhi, Maria Callas, John Berger, Bertrand Russell, Willy Brandt, Alfred Hitchcock, Ansel Adams, Imogen Cunningham, Marc Chagall, Salvador Dalí and Pablo Picasso. Some critics consider his most renowned photographs to be his melancholic black and white pictures taken mostly with a Leica camera in Istanbul, mainly in the 1950s and 1960s.

He has exhibited frequently since then, and also had his work published in special supplements. International publishers have featured his photographs.

Güler's work is collected by the National Library of France in Paris; the George Eastman Museum in Rochester, New York; University of Nebraska-Lincoln Sheldon Memorial Art Gallery; Museum Ludwig Köln, and Das imaginäre Photo-Museum, Köln.

In the 1970s, Güler worked in film, directing the documentary The End of the Hero (1975). It was based on a fictional account of the dismantling of the World War I veteran battlecruiser TCG Yavuz.

Güler's archive contains some 800,000 photographic slides.

Güler's 'philosophy' of photography 
Güler attached the greatest importance to human presence in his photographs and described himself as a "visual historian". "When I'm taking a picture of Aya Sofia, what counts is the person passing by who stands for life", he said. He believed that photography should provide a memory of people, of their lives and especially their suffering. While he considers that art lies, he believes that photography can only reflect reality. He embraced the identity of a photojournalist because he did not attach much value to photography as an artistic pursuit, which to him would have little value. He did not consider photography to be an art.

Death 
Güler died of a heart attack on 17 October 2018. He had been suffering from kidney failure and was being treated with dialysis.

Legacy 
Photographs of Ara Güler were collected in an archive, and are exhihibited in the Ara Güler Museum. In the Şişli district of Istanbul, the museum was established on 16 August 2018.

Publications 
 Ara Güler's Creative Americans.
 Ara Güler: Photographs.
 Ara Güler's Movie Directors.
 Sinan: Architect of Süleyman the Magnificent.
 Living in Turkey.

Bibliography 
 Öster om Eufrat, I Kurdernas Land (Swedish) by Barbro Karabuda, Tidens Förlag, Stockholm, Sweden (1960) 102pp
 Marianna Norris, Young Turkey, Children of Turkey at work and at play, (English), New York: Dodd, Mead, (1964)
 Topkapı Sarayı - Sultan Portreleri, (Turkish) Doğan Kardeş Yayınları, Istanbul, Turkey (1967)
 Turkei, (German) Terra Magica, Munich, Germany (1970)
 Hagia Sophia, (English) by Lord Kinross, New York: Newsweek Books, 1972
 The Splendor of Islamic Calligraphy, (English) Thames & Hudson, London, UK (1976)
 Harems, (English) Chene & Hudson, London, UK (1976)
 Fotoğraflar, (Turkish) Milliyet Yayınları, Istanbul, Turkey (1980)
 Turan Erol, Fikret Mualla, (Turkish), Cem Yayınları, Istanbul, Turkey (1980)
 Turan Erol, Bedri Rahmi, (Turkish), Cem Yayınları, Istanbul, Turkey (1984)
 Aptullah Kuran, Mimar Sinan (Turkish), Hürriyet Vakfı Yayınları, Istanbul, Turkey (1986)
 Aptullah Kuran, Mimar Sinan, (English), Washington D.C.: Institute of Turkish Studies, 1987
 Ara Güler'in Sinamacıları, (Turkish) Hil Yayınları, Istanbul, Turkey (1989)
 Halkarnas Balıkçısı (Cevat Şakir Kabaağaçlı), T.C. Dışişleri, The Sixth Continent, Bakanlığı Kültür Dairesi, Ankara, Turkey (1991)
 John Freely, Augusto Romano Burelli, Sinan: Architect of Suleyman the Magnificent and the Ottoman Golden Age, (English), London: Thames and Hudson, 1992. 
 Stephane Yerasimos, Living in Turkey, (English), London and New York: Thames & Hudson, 1992
 Stephane Yerasimos, Demeures Ottomans de Turquie, (French), Paris: Albin Michel, 1992
 Stephane Yerasimos, Turkish Style,(English), Singapore: Archipelago Press, 1992
 Eski İstanbul Anıları, (Turkish), Dünya Şirketler Grubu, Istanbul, Turkey (1994)
 A Photographical Sketch on Lost Istanbul, (English), Dünya Şirketler Grubu, Istanbul, Turkey (1994)
 Bir Devir Böyle Geçti, Kalanlara Selam Olsun, (Turkish), Ana Yayıncılık, Istanbul, Turkey (1994)
 Yitirilmiş Renkler, (Turkish), Dünya Şirketler Grubu, İstanbul, Turkey (1995)
 Yüzlerinde Yeryüzü (Turkish), Ana Yayıncılık, Istanbul, Turkey (1995)
 Babil'den Sonra Yaşayacağız, (Turkish) Aras Yayınları, Istanbul, Turkey (1996)

Awards 
 1962: Master of Leica
 Légion d'honneur, France
1999: "Photographer of the Century", Turkey
2004: Honorary doctorate, Yıldız Technical University, Istanbul
2005: Grand Prize of Culture and Arts, Turkey
2009: Lucie Award for Lifetime Achievement, New York 
2016: Leica Hall of Fame Award

References 

Additional sources
 
Orga, Ateş (16 January 2019). ARA GÜLER In Memoriam, Turkish Area Studies Review No 33, Spring 2019, pp. 67–71.

External links 
 
 Ara Güler's biography
 Ara Güler at fotograf.net 

 "Vintage Istanbul - in pictures" at The Guardian

1928 births
2018 deaths
People from Beyoğlu
Turkish people of Armenian descent
Ethnic Armenian photographers
Magnum photographers
Officiers of the Légion d'honneur
Turkish photojournalists
Photographers from Istanbul
Istanbul University alumni